Max Philip Emmerich (June 1, 1879 – June 29, 1956) was an American track and field athlete and gymnast who competed in the 1904 Summer Olympics. He was born and died in Indianapolis, Indiana.

In 1904 he won the gold medal in the athletics' triathlon event. He also was 67th in gymnastics' all-around event, 100th in gymnastics' triathlon event and did not finish the first event in athletics all-around competition.

References

External links

 profile

1879 births
1956 deaths
American male artistic gymnasts
Gymnasts at the 1904 Summer Olympics
Athletes (track and field) at the 1904 Summer Olympics
Olympic gymnasts of the United States
Olympic gold medalists for the United States in track and field
Medalists at the 1904 Summer Olympics
American male triathletes
Track and field athletes from Indianapolis
Gymnasts from Indiana
20th-century American people